Asian Highway 83 (AH83)  is a road in the Asian Highway Network running 172 km (107.5 miles) from Qazax, Azerbaijan to Yerevan, Armenia. The route is as follows:

Azerbaijan
  R23 Road: Qazax - Bala Cəfərli

Armenia
  M-4 Highway: Paravakar - Yerevan

Asian Highway Network

Roads in Azerbaijan
Roads in Armenia